Gerald "Gerry" Kelly (born 20 September 1948) is a Northern Irish broadcaster and journalist, best known for his presenting career at UTV where he presented the Friday night talk and variety show Kelly from 1989 until 2005.

He is currently a presenter on BBC Radio Ulster, where he presents on Fridays from 3.00pm to 5.00pm and on Saturdays from 12.00pm to 1.30pm.

Early life
Kelly was born on Thomas Street in Ballymena on the 20 September 1948. His parents were originally from Derry, where his father worked in the shirt industry. He, along the rest of his family moved to Downpatrick in the early 1950s and much of Kelly's early childhood was overshadowed by his father's alcohol problem. In the early 1960s, his father left the family on the pretext of going to Scotland for work, after which Kelly never heard from his father again.

Kelly later went on to work as a teacher and a lecturer at St. Mary's College in Belfast. He also worked as a leisure development officer for Belfast City Council, before going into broadcasting and journalism.

Broadcasting career
Kelly's broadcasting career began at Ulster Television as a part-time GAA reporter, but left the station quickly after being blacklisted by the National Union of Journalists. Following a year's work experience at the Down Recorder, he returned to UTV in 1979 as a reporter, and later presenter, of its evening magazine programme, Good Evening Ulster,.

Kelly also presented the series Lifestyle, Kelly's People, Kelly on Tour, Kelly on the Road, What Next?, Get It Right Next Time and Pick of the Six for Ulster Television. He also presented a radio show called Kelly on the Radio on Downtown Radio.

In September 1989, he began presenting the popular talk and variety show, Kelly, which aired for 571 episodes. Famous guests included a 9-year-old Rory McIlroy who appeared on the show in 1999 after he had won the world under 10s championship and George Best (who appeared in a special edition in 2000, which was the highest-rated edition at 367,000 viewers).

In May 1999, there was speculation that Kelly was one of the few names who were tipped to succeed Gay Byrne as the host of The Late Late Show that aired on RTÉ One in the Republic of Ireland. However, Kelly did not get the position which went to Pat Kenny.

In September 2005, UTV announced that Kelly would end. Kelly said that UTV were unhappy with the show airing in the 9pm slot, as UTV had to opt out of ITV's network schedule. Instead of moving the show to a new different timeslot, UTV took the decision to axe it completely. The final episode of Kelly aired on the 16 December 2005.

After the cancellation of Kelly in 2005, a new series, Gerry Meets... was launched in March 2006. The series concentrated on one-to-one interviews with guests. One 2006 episode, during which Kelly interviewed the DJ Jimmy Savile, received widespread coverage in the national press six years later after the Jimmy Savile sexual abuse scandal first broke. Particular attention was paid to comments Savile made to Kelly that were interpreted as clues to Savile's history as a predatory sex offender.

In January 2008, it was reported that Kelly had left UTV. In an interview with the Belfast Telegraph, Kelly said, "I'm leaving UTV on amicable terms and I have nothing but the highest regard for them.  As far as I'm concerned, they gave me one of the best jobs in the world and I'm grateful to them for that."

In March 2009, it was announced that Kelly would be joining BBC Radio Ulster to present a Saturday afternoon programme, commencing in April.  Kelly replaced the Alan Simpson show on BBC Radio Ulster he is on air from 15:00 - 17:00 on Friday Afternoons.

Awards
In 1993 he received the Sony Gold Award for a special programme following the Shankill Road bombing. In 1998 Kelly was installed in the Royal Television Society Hall of Fame in recognition of his lifelong contribution to broadcasting. He also received two Entertainment and Media Awards and his show Kelly was twice been voted the most entertaining programme in Northern Ireland.

Personal life
Kelly currently lives in Ardglass in County Down with his wife Helena and has two daughters, where he is a member of Ardglass Golf Club. He is also the brother of former Down GAA goalkeeper Danny Kelly.

In February 2018, Kelly announced that he had been diagnosed with cancer two years earlier and had the tumour successfully removed and went through six chemotherapy sessions to tackle the cancer.

References

External links
 Gerry Kelly at BBC Radio Ulster
 

1948 births
BBC Radio Ulster presenters
Living people
People from Ballymena
Radio personalities from Northern Ireland
Schoolteachers from Northern Ireland
Television presenters from Northern Ireland
UTV (TV channel)